Old Malvernians are alumni of Malvern College,  an independent day and boarding school in Malvern, Worcestershire, England that was founded in 1865.  Originally a school for boys aged 9 to 18, it merged in 1992 with a private boys' primary school and an independent school for girls to become coeducational for pupils aged 3 to 18.

Many alumni have gained recognition in such fields as the military, politics, business, science, culture and sport - especially first-class cricket and the eighteen county cricket clubs. Among the most famous Old Malvernians are spymaster James Jesus Angleton, former head of the CIA's counter-intelligence; Aleister Crowley, the controversial but influential occultist; actor Denholm Elliott, sportsman R. E. Foster, the only man to have captained England at both cricket and football; and novelist C. S. Lewis, author of The Chronicles of Narnia. Other well-known personalities include businessman Baron MacLaurin, a former Chairman of Tesco and Vodafone; Jeremy Paxman, journalist, author, and BBC presenter of Newsnight and University Challenge; and Baron Weatherill, the former Speaker of the House of Commons. Old Malvernians who have become heads of state or government include the eponymously titled Viscount Malvern and Najib Tun Razak, the 6th Prime Minister of Malaysia. The former was the British Commonwealth's longest serving Prime Minister by the time he left office. Old Malvernian Nobel Prize winners include Francis William Aston, winner of the 1922 Nobel Prize for Chemistry, and James Meade, winner of the Nobel Prize for Economics in 1977.

A

Lascelles Abercrombie , (1881–1938), poet, journalist, critic
 Diran Adebayo FRSL, novelist, cultural critic and academic, tales of London and the lives of African diasporans
 Brian Aherne, stage, screen, radio and television actor. Hollywood Walk of Fame and Oscar nominee.
 Douglas Allday, First-class cricket cricketer for the Europeans cricket team and British Army officer
 John Anderson, 3rd Viscount Waverley
 James Jesus Angleton, chief of counter-intelligence for the CIA from 1954 to 1974. Source of inspiration for the character Edward Wilson in the film The Good Shepherd.
 Nicholas Argenti, stockbroker, British Army officer, Royal Air Force officer, and philatelist
 Michael Arlen, prolific essayist, short story writer, novelist, playwright, and scriptwriter. 
 Alban Arnold, cricketer for Cambridge University Cricket Club and Hampshire County Cricket Club
 Francis William Aston, chemist and physicist, won the Nobel Prize in Chemistry in 1922 for work on mass spectrometry.

B

 Ralph Bagnold, geo-morphologist, pioneering desert explorer, founder & commander of the Long Range Desert Group
 James Balfour-Melville (1882–1915), British Army officer, footballer for Oxford University A.F.C., and cricketer for Scotland
 Charles Bambridge (1858–1935), England international footballer and captain
 Sir Hugh Shakespear Barnes, British Indian administrator
 Admiral of the Fleet Sir Varyl Begg, First Sea Lord, Governor of Gibraltar
 Prince Joachim of Belgium, Archduke of Austria-Este
 Humphry Berkeley, politician, humourist, early supporter for Gay rights in the UK, and Conservative Member of Parliament.
 Wilfred Bird, played first-class cricket for Middlesex County Cricket Club and Oxford University Cricket Club
 Lieutenant-Colonel Sir Walter Bromley-Davenport, British Army officer, Conservative Member of Parliament, British Army welterweight boxing champion, 
 Sir Stephen Brown GBE, Kt., PC, Lord Justice of Appeal, President of the Family Division of the High Court of Justice, Royal Navy officer 
 Vice Admiral Sir Peter Buchanan, naval officer
 Cuthbert Burnup, England footballer, cricketer for Cambridge University, Marylebone Cricket Club, Kent,  and London county cricket clubs
 Claude Burton, cricketer for Oxford University and Yorkshire County Cricket Club.
 Philip Bushill-Matthews, politician, former Member of the European Parliament

C

 Henry Montgomery Campbell, bishop
 Lieutenant ColonelDuncan Carter-Campbell of Possil OBE, British Army officer
 George Chesterton MBE, cricketer for Worcestershire County Cricket Club, cricket author, and former deputy head of Malvern College
 David Chipp, journalist, former chief editor of Reuters and the Press Association
 Prof Geoffrey Duncan Chisholm FRSE, surgeon and urologist
 Peter Churchill, intelligence officer in Special Operations Executive F Section (1940−1945)
 Horatio Clare, writer of travel, memoir, nature and children's books, and BBC Radio producer
 Sir Andrew Cohen , Governor of Uganda, UK representative to the U.N. Trusteeship Council and Permanent Secretary of the Department for International Development.
 Bernard Collins, Companion of the Order of the Indian Empire, cricketer
 Geoffrey Cornu, cricketer for the Free Foresters Cricket Club and British Army officer
 George Cottrell, former politician and deputy treasurer of the UK Independence Party (UKIP), financier, and convicted felon.
 Aleister Crowley, occultist, ceremonial magician, poet, painter, mountaineer, and prolific author of poetry and novels
 Air Marshal Sir Denis Crowley-Milling, flying ace in the Battle of Britain
 Edward Cuthbertson, cricketer, stockbroker, and British Army officer

D

 Arthur Day, cricketer for Kent County Cricket Club, stockbroker, and British Army officer
 Samuel Day, cricketer for Kent County Cricket Club, footballer for Corinthian F.C., and England
 James Delingpole, journalist, columnist, novellist, Bastiat Prize winner.
 Sir Edward Brandis Denham, colonial governor
 Sir John Dick-Lauder, 11th Baronet
 Digvijaysinhji Ranjitsinhji Jadeja, (1895–1966), Maharaja Jam Sahib of Nawanagar
 Guy Disney, (1982—), First amputee jockey to win a horse race at a professional race-course in Britain (February 2017).
 Monty Don, BBC television presenter, writer and speaker on horticulture
 Ignazio Dracopoli, Anglo-French cartographer and explorer
 Nigel Draffan, cricketer for Cambridge University Cricket Club 
 Sandy Duncan, athlete, general secretary of the British Olympic Association (1949-1975)

E

 Sir Frederick Eden, 2nd Baronet of the Province of Maryland, English writer on poverty and pioneering social investigator
 Ricardo Ellcock, cricketer for Worcestershire and Middlesex county cricket clubs and the England team
 Sir John Ellerman, 2nd Baronet, shipping magnate, natural historian and philanthropist
 Denholm Elliott CBE, actor with 125 film and television credits and 3 times BAFTA award winner.
 Lloyd Embley, journalist, editor-in-chief of the Trinity Mirror group
 William Evans, cricketer for Worcestershire and Hampshire county cricket clubs
 Ambrose Evans-Pritchard,  international business editor of The Daily Telegraph and author of The Secret Life of Bill Clinton.

F

 John Ferraby, Hand of the Cause in the Bahá’í Faith
 Air Vice-Marshal Sir Edward Fielden, pilot, Captain of The Queen's Flight
  Sir Eustace Fiennes, 1st Baronet of Banbury, politician, colonial governor
 Sir Gerald Fitzmaurice, barrister, judge
 Sir Charles Fletcher-Cooke, politician and Conservative MP, barrister (QC), and Member of the European Parliament 
 Giles Foden, author of The Last King of Scotland
 "Fostershire", the Foster brothers who played for Worcestershire County Cricket Club:
 Basil Foster, Geoffrey Foster, Harry Foster, Maurice Foster, Neville Foster, Reginald "Tip" Foster, the only man to have captained England at both cricket and football, and Wilfrid "Bill" Foster
 Major General John F. C. Fuller, military historian, strategist, occultist

G

 Sir Anthony Hastings George, British Consul-General in Shanghai and Boston
 Sir Peter Gibson, judge and Lord Justice of Appeal
 Carl Alexander Gibson-Hill (1911–1963), doctor, naturalist and Director of the Raffles Museum in Singapore
 Penrhyn Grant Jones, CBE, Assistant Judge of the British Supreme Court for China
 Doctor Greenwood (1860–1951), Blackburn Rovers and England international footballer
 William Mitchell Grundy, English headmaster, son of Rev. W. Grundy,  a former Headmaster of Malvern College.

H

 Sir William Henry Hadow, English educationist, musicologist
 St. John Emile Clavering Hankin, Edwardian essayist and playwright
 Prince Christian of Hanover
 Prince Ernst August of Hanover
 Air Chief Marshal Sir Donald Hardman, flying ace, CAF (RAAF)
 Fred Hargreaves,footballer for Blackburn Rovers and the England team ,  cricketer for Lancashire County Cricket Club.
 Jack Haynes (born 2001), cricketer for Worcestershire County Cricket Club and England squad for the 2020 Under-19 Cricket World Cup
 Josh Haynes (born 1999), cricketer for Leeds/Bradford MCC University 
 General Sir Charles Harington, Deputy Chief of the General Staff
 George Harrison (1860–1900), cricketer for Oxford University Cricket Club
 Oliver Harvey, 1st Baron Harvey of Tasburgh   (1893–1968), diplomat
 Peter Hatch, British Army officer, first-class cricketer for the Combined Services cricket team
 Colonel Sir Peter Hilton WWII vetera awarded the Military Cross and two bars
 Errol Holmes, cricketer for Oxford University, Surrey County Cricket Club and England
 Sir Peter Holmes (1932-2002), businessman, managing director (1985-1993) and chief executive officer (1992-1993) of Royal Dutch Shell
 Owen Hughes DFC, cricketer and officer in both the British Army and the Royal Flying Corps
 Travers Christmas Humphreys, QC, barrister, judge, founder of the London Buddhist Society and prolific author of books on the Buddhist tradition

J

 Arnold Jackson, athlete (1500m gold medallist, 1912 Summer Olympics); youngest ever British Army Brigadier-General, awarded DSO & Three Bars; barrister.
 Ivan Johnson, cricketer for Worcestershire County Cricket Club and journalist
 Donald Johnston, British Army officer and cricketer for Oxford University Cricket Club

K

 Shapur Kharegat journalist, editor and Asia Director of The Economist
 Donald Knight, first-class cricket for Surrey County Cricket Club, Oxford University Cricket Club and England
 Tom Kohler-Cadmore (cricketer) for Worcestershire and Yorkshire county cricket clubs.

L

 Sir Paul Ogden Lawrence,  barrister (QC), Court of Appeal judge, and Privy Council member
 Geoffrey Legge, pilot in the Fleet Air Arm during World War II, cricketer for Kent County Cricket Club and England team.
 Brian Lewis, 2nd Baron Essendon shipping, motor racing
 C. S. Lewis, novelist, scholar, Author of The Chronicles of Narnia.
 Warren Lewis (brother of C.S.Lewis), historian
 Lancelot Lowther, 6th Earl of Lonsdale
 Prince Joseph Wenzel of Liechtenstein, second in the line of succession to the Liechtensteiner throne and third in the Jacobite line of succession to the thrones of England, Scotland and Ireland.

M

 Ian MacLaurin, Baron MacLaurin of Knebworth, businessman, sports administrator
 Neil MacLaurin, son of Ian MacLaurin, and cricketer for Hertfordshire County Cricket Club and Middlesex County Cricket Club 
 Bill Maidlow, cricketer for Oxford University Cricket Club
 Godfrey Martin Huggins, 1st Viscount Malvern, Prime Minister of Southern Rhodesia and of Rhodesia and Nyasaland, once described as the longest serving Prime Minister in British Commonwealth history.
 Frank Mann, cricketer for Cambridge University Cricket Club, Middlesex County Cricket Club, and England cricket captain
 Ronald Mansbridge, publisher, author
 Eric Marx, South African cricketer, holder of a batting world record that stood for 73 years 
 James Meade, economist, 1977 winner of the Nobel Prize in Economics
 Brian Mears, chairman of Chelsea Football Club
 Joe Mears, chairman of The Football Association
 General Sir John Mogg, Deputy Supreme Allied Commander Europe (DSACEUR)
 Air chief marshal Hrushikesh Moolgavkar, 9th Chief of Staff of the Indian Air Force
 Raymond Mortimer, writer, critic, literacy editor
 Edward Moss, cricketer for Oxford University Cricket Club, Berkshire County Cricket Club, and Royal Air Force Volunteer Reserve officer
 Eric Moxey, recipient of the George Cross
 Kenneth Muir, recipient of the Victoria Cross
 Jonathan Myles-Lea, artist (landscape painter)

N

 Najib Razak, 6th Prime Minister of Malaysia
 David Nash, cricketer for Middlesex County Cricket Club 
 Ivor Norton , cricketer for Marylebone Cricket Club, and British Army officer
 Sir Thomas Willans Nussey, 1st Baronet, barrister, Liberal Party politician, Member of Parliament

O

P

 Hubert Parker, Australian politician, Attorney-General of Western Australia
 Norman Partridge, cricketer for Cambridge University and Warwickshire
 James Paul, Argentine cricketer
 Giles Paxman, diplomat, HM Ambassador to Spain.
 Jeremy Paxman, journalist, author, broadcaster, presenter of University Challenge, brother of Giles Paxman
 Thelwell Pike (1866–1957),  footballer for Cambridge University, Crusaders, Brentwood Town, Swifts, Thanet Wanderers and Corinthian, and England
 James Plowden-Wardlaw, barrister and Church of England priest. 
 Mark Pougatch, radio and television broadcaster, journalist, author, and presenter for ITV Sport,
 Sir Ghillean Prance, botanist,  Director of the Royal Botanic Gardens, Kew from 1988 to 1999

R

 Ahmed Rashid, Pakistani journalist, author
 John Rawlinson (1867–1945), cricketer for Oxford University Cricket Club, and stockbroker
 Christopher Reginald Reeves, banker (Morgan, Grenfell & Co. and Merrill Lynch)
 Charles Ridsdale, Anglican Bishop
 Sir Howard Robertson, president of the Royal Institute of British Architects from 1952 to 1954 and winner of the Royal Gold Medal for architecture.
 Alan S. C. Ross, linguist and ultimate source and inspiration for Nancy Mitford's 'U and non-U' forms of behaviour and language usage.
 Francis Routh, composer of some 85 published works, including three symphonies, chamber music, large scale solo piano and organ works and several song cycles
 Irwin Peter Russell, poet, translator, critic, World War II British Army officer

S

 Dominic Sandbrook, historian, author and journalist
 Guy Sanderson, Bishop of Plymouth 
 Dennis W. Sciama , astrophysicist, PhD supervisor to cosmologists, including Stephen Hawking, Martin Rees and David Deutsch; he is considered one of the fathers of modern cosmology, author of The Unity of the Universe (1959)
 Major General Logan Scott-Bowden  , first commander of the Ulster Defence Regiment, Colonel-Commandant of the Royal Engineers from 1975 to 1980
 Oliver Selfridge, computer scientist and a pioneer of artificial intelligence.
 Hugh Sells (1922–1978), cricketer for Royal Air Force cricket team, and Royal Air Force officer
 Sir Tom Shebbeare, Director of Charities to Charles, Prince of Wales
 Roger Short, diplomat, expert on Turkish affairs, and served as consul-general in Oslo and was the British ambassador to Bulgaria
 George Simpson-Hayward, cricketer for Worcestershire County Cricket Club (captain) where he was captain, and for the England cricket team
 Sydney Goodsir Smith, poet, artist, dramatist and novelist
 Christopher Storrs, priest, Bishop of the Anglican Diocese of Grafton, New South Wales
 Alfred Stratford, cricketer for Marylebone Cricket Club and Middlesex County Cricket Club. Footballer for England and three times FA Cup winner with Wanderers F.C.
 I. M. B. Stuart (1902–1969), Ireland rugby footballer, schoolmaster, and author 
 Lieutenant Colonel Sir Stewart Symes , colonial governor

T

 Eddy Temple-Morris, DJ, record producer, TV presenter
 Baron Temple-Morris, barrister, politician, Conservative Member of Parliament, member of the House of Lords as a Labour peer
 Sir Richard Thompson, 1st Baronet, politician, Conservative Member of Parliament 
 Meredith Thring, inventor and writer on energy conservation
 Roger Tolchard, cricketer for Leicestershire County Cricket Club and England
 Thomas Trotter, concert organist. Organist of Birmingham City, St Margaret's, Westminster, and president of St Albans International Organ Festival.
 Frank Tuff, cricketer for Oxford University and the Free Foresters
 Orville Turnquest OBE ,  politician (The Bahamas)

V

 James Vivian, Director of Music of St George’s Chapel, Windsor Castle.

W

Neville Wadia, Chairman of Bombay Dyeing
 Fulke Walwyn (1910–1991), racehorse jockey and trainer
 Baron Bernard Weatherill, politician, Speaker of the House of Commons
 Sir John Wheeler-Bennett, historian
 John Baker White, political writer, secret agent, politician,  Member of Parliament for Canterbury
 Tim Whitmarsh, Classicist at Cambridge University, Fellow in Greek at Corpus Christi College, Oxford, and Professor of Ancient Literatures at the University of Oxford, Fellow of the British Academy 
 Chris Whitty, epidemiologist and Chief Medical Officer for England during the COVID-19 pandemic 
 Maurice Wilks (1904–1963), motor and aeronautical engineer, businessman. Conceived and developed the Land Rover.
 Cecil Williamson, screenwriter, editor and film director and influential Neopagan and Warlock
 Robert Wilson, politician, Deputy Speaker of the House of Commons of Northern Ireland
 Charles Wittenoom, Australian politician, Member of the Western Australian Legislative Council
 Lieutenant-Colonel John Woodhouse  , pioneer of the Special Air Service selection systems, and creator of the soft drink Panda Pops

X, Y, Z

 David Younger, British Army officer, recipient of the Victoria Cross (posthumously)

References

External links
 Malvernian Society (Old Malvernians) web page
 Malvern College web site

Malvernians

People associated with Malvern, Worcestershire
Malvernian